Christopher Joseph Carter  (born 4 May 1952) is a former New Zealand Labour Party and independent Member of the New Zealand Parliament. He was a senior Cabinet Minister in the Fifth Labour Government of New Zealand, serving lastly as Minister of Education, Minister Responsible for the Education Review Office and Minister of Ethnic Affairs. He was the Member of Parliament for the Te Atatu electorate, where he was first elected in 1993. He did not win re-election (to the replacement seat, Waipareira) in 1996, but won a new and expanded Te Atatu seat in 1999. In 2010 he was suspended from the Labour Party caucus following a dispute with party leader Phil Goff, shortly afterwards he became an independent MP. He was expelled by the Labour Party for breaching the Party's constitution in bringing the Party in disrepute, on 11 October 2010. In September 2011 Carter resigned from Parliament following his appointment to a United Nations position in Afghanistan where he served for 4 years. In 2015 he was appointed to head UN operations in Rakhine State in Myanmar where he served for 3 years. In 2018 he rejoined the New Zealand Labour Party and stood for election as a Labour Party representative in the 2019 New Zealand local elections. Carter was elected and appointed as Chairperson of the Henderson Massey Local Board with 11,250 votes. He also won election in 2019 as one of the 7 elected Board Members of the Waitemata District Health Board with 14,593 votes. Both positions have three year terms.

Early and personal life

Carter was born on 4 May 1952, and brought up in the Auckland suburb of Panmure. He was educated at St Peter's College, Auckland and at the University of Auckland where he received an MA (Hons) in history.

Before entering politics, Carter had served as a teacher and as a poultry farmer. His partner is Peter Kaiser, a headmaster, and they have been together for over 40 years. On 10 February 2007, Carter and Kaiser were joined in the first civil union for a Cabinet Minister or Member of Parliament since civil unions in New Zealand were introduced after legislation was passed in December 2004.

Member of Parliament

At the  Carter stood unsuccessfully as the Labour Party candidate in the Albany electorate, losing to National's Don McKinnon. In a local-body election in 1988 he stood as a candidate for the Te Atatu ward of the Auckland Regional Authority, but was unsuccessful. He placed third out of six candidates. In the lead up to the  he contested the Labour nomination for the seat of Te Atatu. One of six contenders, he emerged one of the two front-runners alongside news service manager Dan McCaffrey. At the selection meeting McCaffrey was successful.

At the  he stood as the Labour candidate for Te Atatu and won the seat. In 1993 he was appointed Labour's spokesperson for Ethnic Affairs. In 1994, Carter was named by the Speaker of the House Peter Tapsell for calling John Banks a hypocrite over his anti-abortion stance on abortions.

After losing his seat, Carter started one of the first branches of New Zealand Rainbow Labour for centre-left lesbians, gays, bisexuals, transgender people (LGBT) and others during the 1996–1999 term. At the  the Te Atatu seat was recreated and he won the seat once again. From 1999 to 2002 he was Labour's junior whip.

After being re-elected in  Carter was elevated to cabinet and was appointed Minister of Conservation, Minister of Local Government and Minister of Ethnic Affairs. In 2004 he was additionally appointed Minister for Building Issues. Carter was the first openly gay man ever appointed as a New Zealand Cabinet minister. He had been a strong advocate of gay equality for some time, and continued this role on entering Parliament.

Carter was re-elected, but his majority was almost halved to 5,298.

On 14 June 2010, 4 days after the release of ministerial credit card records, Carter along with two other MPs Shane Jones MP and Mita Ririnui MP (Lab – Lists) were demoted by Opposition Leader Phil Goff MP for misuse of such credit cards. In the case of Carter, he was accused of purchasing personal items with the card, which was outside the rules for Ministerial expenditure as a minister under the former Clark government over a six-year period. Carter repaid the money in full, a total of $26 ($NZ). His main dispute with Phil Goff was over allegations by Goff that Carter had travelled too much as a Cabinet Minister. All of Carter's travel as a minister was official travel and approved by Cabinet (of which Goff was a member). Carter's demotion included removal from the front bench, and loss of the shadow portfolio of Foreign Affairs. Carter subsequently speculated publicly about whether he would continue as a Member of Parliament.

As a cabinet minister, Carter was entitled to the title of The Honourable and became The Hon. Mr Chris Carter, which is a title granted for the rest of his life.

On 29 July 2010 Carter was suspended from the Labour Party caucus for allegedly being behind an anonymous letter sent around the press gallery claiming there was a leadership challenge against Phil Goff; a charge he later admitted. On 17 August 2010, Speaker Lockwood Smith announced that Carter was officially an independent MP and no longer a Labour MP.

Carter remained an independent MP until his resignation as a Member of Parliament on 30 September 2011. Because Carter's resignation was less than six months prior to the general election on 26 November , no by-election was held to fill the vacancy he created.

United Nations

In early September 2011 Carter was appointed as programme manager of the Governance Unit of the United Nations Development Programme (UNDP) in Afghanistan, leading the strengthening of local governance in all 34 Afghan Provinces. He served in that role for 4 years.

If his Australian colleague had not been late, they could have been the victims of the attack themselves. Carter considered it a "close shave".

In September 2015 Carter was appointed as the Senior UN Advisor for Rakhine State in Myanmar after serving for 4 years in Afghanistan. His Myanmar role, which he filled until 2019, was to lead and coordinate development by UN Agencies operating in Rakhine State, a region of Myanmar marked by serious religious and ethnic conflict between Buddhist and Muslim communities.

Local politics

In 2019, Carter retired from the United Nations after seven years' service and returned to New Zealand to live in Te Atatū. He had rejoined the New Zealand Labour Party in 2018. In the 2019 New Zealand local elections, he was elected a member of Auckland Council's Henderson-Massey Local Board and became chairperson. He was re-elected in 2022 and retained the position of chairperson. He was also elected as a member of the Waitemata District Health Board.

References

Further reading

 For some more biographical details: List of alumni of St Peter's College, Auckland

External links

  Parliamentary website page

|-

|-

1952 births
Gay politicians
LGBT members of the Parliament of New Zealand
Living people
Members of the Cabinet of New Zealand
Ministers of Housing (New Zealand)
New Zealand educators
New Zealand farmers
New Zealand Labour Party MPs
People from the Auckland Region
University of Auckland alumni
People educated at St Peter's College, Auckland
Independent MPs of New Zealand
New Zealand education ministers
Members of the New Zealand House of Representatives
New Zealand MPs for Auckland electorates
Unsuccessful candidates in the 1987 New Zealand general election
Unsuccessful candidates in the 1996 New Zealand general election
21st-century New Zealand politicians
21st-century New Zealand LGBT people